Giiwo (also known as Bu Giiwo, Kirfi, Kirifi, Kirifawa) is an Afro-Asiatic language spoken in Nigeria.

Notes 

West Chadic languages
Languages of Nigeria